The 1971 Cal Poly Pomona Broncos football team represented California State Polytechnic College, Kellogg-Voorhis—now known as California State Polytechnic University, Pomona—as a member of the California Collegiate Athletic Association (CCAA) during the 1971 NCAA College Division football season. Led by third-year head coach Roy Anderson, Cal Poly Pomona compiled an overall record of 6–5 with a mark of 1–3 in conference play, placing fourth in the CCAA. The team was outscored by its opponents 260 to 246 for the season. The Broncos played home games at Kellogg Field in Pomona, California.

Schedule

Team players in the NFL
The following Cal Poly Pomona players were selected in the 1972 NFL Draft.

References

Cal Poly Pomona
Cal Poly Pomona Broncos football seasons
Cal Poly Pomona Broncos football